Yenisahra is a neighborhood in the Ataşehir district of Istanbul, Turkey. It is situated on the Anatolian side of the city, on the border of the Kadıköy district. The place became neighborhood in 1974 and its current population is around 12,000.

References

Ataşehir Municipality's page

Neighbourhoods of Ataşehir
Populated places in Istanbul Province